The Parti présidentiel was a political party in Quebec, Canada. It was founded on May 5, 1974 by former Liberal Party of Quebec Member of the National Assembly Yvon Dupuis. Dupuis founded the party after resigning from the leadership of the Ralliement créditiste du Québec. Dupuis resigned from the leadership later in 1974, and was replaced by Yvon Brochu.  On May 31, 1975, the party merged with the Union Nationale party.

See also
Politics of Quebec
List of Quebec general elections
National Assembly of Quebec
Timeline of Quebec history
List of political parties in Quebec

Provincial political parties in Quebec
Political parties established in 1974
Political parties established in 1975
Defunct political parties in Canada
1974 establishments in Quebec
1975 disestablishments in Quebec